
Gmina Uścimów is a rural gmina (administrative district) in Lubartów County, Lublin Voivodeship, in eastern Poland.

The gmina contains part of the protected area called Łęczna Lake District Landscape Park.

Villages
Gmina Uścimów contains the villages and settlements of Drozdówka, Głębokie, Krasne, Maśluchy, Nowa Jedlanka, Nowy Uścimów, Ochoża, Orzechów-Kolonia, Rudka Starościańska, Ryczka, Stara Jedlanka and Uścimów.

Neighbouring gminas
Gmina Uścimów is bordered by the gminas of Dębowa Kłoda, Ludwin, Ostrów Lubelski, Parczew and Sosnowica.

References

Polish official population figures 2006

Uscimow
Lubartów County